Canna Hasmukh Patel is an Indian architect and interior designer based in Ahmedabad. Patel is also a visiting faculty at CEPT University and also works as a guide for the various architecture students at CEPT. Detailing and integration of art in her interiors and architecture are trademarks of her work. Patel firmly believes in simplicity and a holistic link between Interiors & Architecture.

Early life and career 
Canna was born to architect Hasmukh Patel and Bhakti Patel. She completed her bachelor's degree at CEPT University and Masters at University of California, Berkeley (U.S.). Canna is also the founder of the Institute of Indian Interior Designers (IIID), Ahmedabad chapter and also served as the chairperson for same. Canna founded HCPID in 2006 and has been serving as the chairperson of the organization since. HCPID has successfully completed projects in Delhi, Mumbai, Jaipur, Indore & Gujarat. There is a distinctive Indian-ness in its works, which helps to render them timeless for the setting they occupy. Patel's projects reflect a fine sensitivity to the Indian climate and social norms.

In February 2015, she was appointed as a member of Academic Advisory Board for the School of Environment Design and Architecture at the Navrachana University. In her professional career of more 30 years, she has worked on more than 300 projects of varying scale. Patel is currently serving as the Interior Sub-Consultants on the Central Vista Project.

Notable works 

 Alliance Francaise Ahmedabad
 Chief Minister's office, Gandhinagar
 Gujarat High Court
 Raj Bhavan, Gandhinagar
New Era Global School
Sachivalay, Gandhinagar

Awards and recognition 

 National Merit Scholarship, Government of India - 1978
Listed at Hot 100 in 2018 by Architect and Interiors India Magazine
 Women Achievers Awards by JSAF (2013)
Awarded for her contribution to the field of business by Business Women committee, Gujarat Chamber of Commerce and Industry (GCCI)
Part of Forbes India 'The Bold Club: India's Top 30 Architects’ (2021)

Personal life 
Canna is married to an academician Mukesh Patel who also runs an art management company. She is the sister of architect Bimal Patel.

References 

21st-century Indian architects
Year of birth missing (living people)
Living people
Indian architects
People from Ahmedabad
Indian interior designers